The Voćin massacre was the killing of 350 Serb civilians in Voćin, Independent State of Croatia, by the Ustaše Croatian fascist organization on 14 January 1942, during World War II. The massacre was carried out as retaliation for partisans' action in Papuk.

Background 
On 12 January 1942, in a direct fight between the Partisans and the Ustaše, five Ustaše were killed, and two wounded, one of whom died later.

The Partisans withdrew to Papuk, and Ustaše returned to Voćin and waited for reinforcements from Osijek, Belišće and Virovitica.

Massacre 
On 13 January, some 300 Ustaše and Domobran soldiers began with plundering and burning Serbian houses. Civilians who tried to escape or provided resistance were killed and all others were arrested and taken to Voćin.

On Serbian New Year, January 14, the biggest slaughter of the innocent population in Slavonia at that time started. Almost all the male inhabitants of the villages Jorgići, Zubovići, Dobrići, Kometnik and Sekulinci were killed.

During the massacre, a total of 350 civilians were killed.

Acts of individual heroism 

In addition to the victims, some managed to save many Serbs from Voćin and its surroundings. The Croat gendarme sergeant Luka Mustafić managed to save the lives of 10 Serbs during the massacre.

Aftermath 
On the following day, Ustaše transported Serb corpses to a mass grave that was excavated east of Voćin, along the Voćinka river.

The most significant consequence of this crime was strengthening of the partisan movement in the area of Voćin and Podravska Slatina,  exactly the opposite effect of what NDH's authorities tried to achieve. Although during 1941 and early 1942 there were not many local residents in favor of active resistance, due to increasing existential threat, a large number of Serbs from the surrounding villages joined the partisan units.

A memorial to the victims of this massacre was erected in 2007.

References 

Mass murder in 1942
Massacres in 1942
Massacres in the Independent State of Croatia
Genocide of Serbs in the Independent State of Croatia
Independent State of Croatia
Massacres in Yugoslavia
Massacres of Serbs
January 1942 events
1942 in Croatia
Yugoslavia in World War II